Les églantines sont peut-être formidables is the tenth album by experimental pop French musician Brigitte Fontaine and the eighth by Areski Belkacem, released in 1980 on the Saravah label. Because of its arrangements, described as almost "disco" by Fontaine herself, a sound that she can't stand, she has disowned the album and refused its re-release on CD, although it has been pressed in Japan in October 2008 by the Columbia Music Entertainment label.

Track listing

Personnel 
 Mimi Lorenzini: electric guitar, acoustic guitar
 Thierry Tamain: piano, electric piano Fender, Hammond organ
 Anne Ballester: electric piano Fender, synthesizers A.R.P. and Odyssey Oberheim
 Frank Raholison: drums, percussion
 Emmanuel Binet: bass guitar
 Kakino Depaz: qanun

References 

Brigitte Fontaine albums
Areski Belkacem albums
1980 albums